Audubon County is a county in the U.S. state of Iowa. As of the 2020 census, the population was 5,674, making it Iowa's third-least populous county. Its county seat is Audubon. The county was named after John James Audubon, the naturalist and artist.

History 
Audubon County was formed on January 15, 1851, from sections of Pottawattamie County. It was named after John James Audubon.  The current Audubon County Court House was opened in 1940.

Geography

Major highways
 U.S. Highway 71
 Iowa Highway 44
 Iowa Highway 173

Adjacent counties
Carroll County  (north)
Guthrie County  (east)
Cass County  (south)
Shelby County  (west)

Demographics

2020 census
There were 2,787 housing units of which 2,498 were occupied.

2010 census
There were 2,972 housing units, of which 2,617 were occupied.

2000 census

As of the census of 2000, there were 6,830 people, 2,773 households, and 1,927 families residing in the county.  The population density was 15 people per square mile (6/km2).  There were 2,995 housing units at an average density of 7 per square mile (3/km2).  The racial makeup of the county was 99.17% White, 0.15% Black or African American, 0.09% Native American, 0.19% Asian, 0.03% from other races, and 0.38% from two or more races.  0.48% of the population were Hispanic or Latino of any race.

There were 2,773 households, out of which 30.10% had children under the age of 18 living with them, 61.40% were married couples living together, 5.60% had a female householder with no husband present, and 30.50% were non-families. 28.20% of all households were made up of individuals, and 16.70% had someone living alone who was 65 years of age or older.  The average household size was 2.40 and the average family size was 2.94.

In the county, the population was spread out, with 25.90% under the age of 18, 5.00% from 18 to 24, 22.70% from 25 to 44, 22.90% from 45 to 64, and 23.50% who were 65 years of age or older.  The median age was 42 years. For every 100 females there were 92.00 males.  For every 100 females age 18 and over, there were 89.10 males.

The median income for a household in the county was $32,215, and the median income for a family was $37,288. Males had a median income of $28,090 versus $17,528 for females. The per capita income for the county was $17,489.  About 6.70% of families and 7.70% of the population were below the poverty line, including 8.20% of those under age 18 and 7.80% of those age 65 or over.

Communities

Cities
Audubon
Brayton
Exira
Gray
Kimballton

Townships
Audubon County is divided into twelve townships:

 Audubon
 Cameron
 Douglas
 Exira
 Greeley
 Hamlin
 Leroy
 Lincoln
 Melville
 Oakfield
 Sharon
 Viola

Population ranking
The population ranking of the following table is based on the 2020 census of Audubon County.
† county seat

Politics

See also

National Register of Historic Places listings in Audubon County, Iowa
Audubon County Court House

References

Further reading 

 

External links 

Audubon County

 
1851 establishments in Iowa
Populated places established in 1851